The Tajikistan-Afghanistan bridge spanning the Panj River between Panji Poyon (or Nizhniy Pyandzh), Tajikistan and Sherkhan Bandar, Afghanistan was opened on 26 August 2007.
It cost approximately $40 million, financed by the US Army Corps of Engineers and was designed and constructed by an Italian company, Rizzani de Eccher S.p.A.
The Tajik President Emomali Rahmon and Afghan President Hamid Karzai were joined by US Secretary of Commerce Carlos Gutierrez at the opening ceremony.

See also
 
 
 
 
 Tajik–Afghan bridge at Tem-Demogan
 Tajik–Afghan Friendship Bridge

References

Road bridges in Afghanistan
Bridges in Tajikistan
Afghanistan–Tajikistan border crossings
Bridges completed in 2007
2007 establishments in Afghanistan
2007 establishments in Tajikistan